"Here" is the debut single by Canadian singer-songwriter Alessia Cara, released on April 30, 2015. It is the lead single from her extended play (EP) Four Pink Walls (2015) and her debut album Know-It-All (2015). Created around a sample of "Ike's Rap II" by Isaac Hayes from his album Black Moses, "Here" is a pop and R&B song about people who secretly hate parties.

The song was a sleeper hit, debuting at number 95 on the US Billboard Hot 100 for the week of August 22, 2015, becoming Cara's first entry on the chart. It later became her first top five single on the chart and reached the top of the US Pop Songs chart after a historic 26-week climb which broke a record held by Cee Lo Green's "Fuck You" and Demi Lovato's "Give Your Heart a Break". "Here" has charted in the top 40 in Australia, Canada, Netherlands, New Zealand, and the United Kingdom. The official remix features US rapper Logic. The song was featured on the third season of the comedy-drama television series Younger.

Background and composition

While working on her debut album in 2014, Cara attended a house party. She told NME, "Everyone seemed to know each other, but not me. It was sweaty, there was a guy and girl passed out with vomit all over her, people were just stepping over them." The party caused her so much discomfort that she called her mother asking to take her home. Cara discussed the party with co-writer Sebastian Kole who then came up with the first line of the song. Her record label, Def Jam, initially persuaded her to release another song that was more friendly for radio, but Cara pushed for the release of "Here" as she felt the other song would not have made her stand out from other singers.

"Here" is a pop and R&B song. It samples "Ike's Rap II" by Isaac Hayes from the album Black Moses, which had also been sampled in Portishead's "Glory Box" and Tricky's "Hell Is Round the Corner". Oak Felder and Pop Wansel argued about wanting a Portishead or Hayes sample for the song, both unaware it was the same one.

Critical reception
"Here" was met with critical acclaim by music critics, who praised the song's concept and lyrics. Rolling Stone ranked "Here" at number 21 on its year-end list of the 50 best songs of 2015. Billboard ranked "Here" at number six on its year-end list: "If Lordes 'Royals' was a rallying cry for those who felt isolated by the rampart materialism in pop culture, then Alessia Cara's 'Here' is the anthem for those fed up with the glut of pop songs about partying and drinking. Thanks to the teenage R&B singer, being an introvert is finally cool again." The prestigious Village Voice voted "Here" the 18th-best single released in 2015 on their annual year-end critics' poll, Pazz & Jop; the song is tied with Courtney Barnetts "Depreston".

Accolades

Music video
An official lyric video of the song was released on her YouTube page on May 7, 2015. The official video was directed by Aaron A and was released on her YouTube page on May 26, 2015. The video uses the inspiration of how Cara wrote the song by having her at a party and being the only one moving while the party is frozen in time, while she's next to crowds of girls and guys drinking beer and gossiping. The visual effect of the frozen partygoers predated the viral Internet phenomenon Mannequin Challenge.

Track listing
Digital download – The Remixes
"Here" (Logic Remix) (featuring Logic) – 3:20
"Here" (Jaden Smith Remix) (featuring Jaden Smith) – 3:44
"Here" (Chris Lorenzo Remix) – 4:54
"Here" (Imanos & Gramercy Remix) – 3:27

2:00 AM version 

A 2:00 AM version was included in the deluxe edition of the album Know-It-All.

Live performances
On July 29, 2015, Cara made her US television debut on The Tonight Show Starring Jimmy Fallon performing "Here" with house band The Roots, after host Jimmy Fallon discovered the song online. On October 31, 2015, Cara joined Taylor Swift onstage as a surprise guest at the 1989 World Tour in Tampa, Florida, singing a duet of "Here" for Swift's last US show. On November 20, 2015, Cara sang "Here" live during the closing credits of the NBC live comedy, Undateable.

Charts

Weekly charts

Year-end charts

Certifications

References

2015 debut singles
2015 songs
Alessia Cara songs
Def Jam Recordings singles
Music videos directed by Aaron A
Song recordings produced by Pop & Oak
Songs written by Pop Wansel
Songs written by Oak Felder
Songs written by Isaac Hayes
Songs about loneliness
Songs about drugs
Trip hop songs
Songs written by Alessia Cara
Songs written by Sebastian Kole